Amuro is a town in Kogi State, Nigeria.

References

Populated places in Kogi State